Academy Fantasia, Season 6 is the sixth season of Academy Fantasia which premiered on True Visions on June 29, 2009.

Zani (V6), Nipaporn Thitithanakarn, won in the competition. She was the first female winner of Academy Fantasia.

Changes from Season 5

It was announced before the season get started that there would be no surprise in a previous way like first five seasons. No voting back, or the other twists to get eliminated contestants back into the competition again. They would cut the contestants off week by week until the final concert, week 12. If so, it confirmed that would be only two finalists in the final round, unlike in the previously seasons.

Later, it declared that at the end of every concerts, the judges would give The Immunity Idol to save one of the bottom three contestants who performed best. This means that the immuned contestant would be safe automatically, and if the contestant with the fewest popular votes was the one who got The Immunity Idol, no one will be eliminated in that concert.

On the other hand, if the contestant with the fewest popular votes was not the same as the immuned contestant, they would send the fewest votes contestant home immediately as in a normal elimination scenario. From this rule, the number of finalists in the grand finale concert might be a whole top 12 (if The Immunity Idol could save every week), or only two candidates.

Auditions

There were two channel for auditions, Live and Online. The contestants were required to between the ages of 18 to 28 years old who are not embedded with music recording contracts.

The Live Auditions were held in the following cities:
The South district, Surat Thani
The North district, Chiangmai
The Northeast district, Nakhon Ratchasima
The Center district, Bangkok

Semi-finalists

The Top 100 finalists (50 from live audition and 50 from online audition) were announced and made the final audition together in front of all judges. The final audition were held at The Akara Theater of King Power Complex, Bangkok, on May 20, 2009.

In this season, they broadcast the final auditions live for two days on True Visions. The Top 100 finalists were cut off to Top 50, Top 30, and finally they declared the Top 12 who would get into the AF house to study and perform 12 concerts in this competition.

It was noticed that there were only 12 final contestants, unlike in the Season 4 and Season 5 which had Top 20 and Top 16, respectively, get into the house, and then cut them off to Top 12 within first two concerts.

Concert summaries

Week 1 - My Style
Original Airdate: July 4, 2009

 Bottom three: Krit (V7), Nooknick (V9), & Tabby (V11)
 Immuned: Tabby (V11)
 Eliminated: Krit (V7)
The first concert of AF6 was in a theme called "My Style" which represents contestant's style of music they were good at. The bottom three result was announced after the show ended, and judges decided to immune Tabby (V11) by giving her The Immunity Idol to be safe from elimination. However, after the popular votes result was declared, the contestant with the fewest votes was not Tabby (V11), but was Krit (V7). He was the first contestant who was eliminated in this season.

Week 2 - Party & Radio Hits
Original Airdate: July 11, 2009

 Bottom three: Newty (V4), Nooknick (V9), & Tabby (V11)
 Immuned: Newty (V4)
 Eliminated: Tabby (V11)
The theme of this week is the hit music from party and radio. It was the second time that Nooknick (V9) and Tabby (V11) were in the bottom three rank. But not lucky for them both, because the contestant that received immunity was Newty (V4), first time in the bottom three. In the end, the votes result was announced that Tabby (V11) got the fewest popular votes and was sent home in Week 2.

Week 3 - Tribute to King of Pop "Michael Jackson"
Original Airdate: July 18, 2009

1Surprised from eliminated contestants, Krit & Tabby

 Bottom three: Ich (V1), Zani (V6), & Mac (V8)
 Immuned & Safe from elimination: Zani (V6)
The week 3 concert was a tribute theme for Michael Jackson. Krit & Tabby provided a surprise, performing "Thriller" on the stage. After the bottom three were announced, judges decided to provide immunity to Zani (V6) who performed best in the bottom rank. Lastly, the popular votes result showed that Zani (V6) also got the fewest votes of the night. From the Immunity Idol she received, she was saved from this elimination and all of 10 contestants still remain in the competition.

Week 4 - Hard Rock
Original Airdate: July 25, 2009

 Bottom three: Koonjae-Sal (V3), Nooknick (V9), & Itch (V12)
 Immuned: Nooknick (V9)
 Eliminated: Itch (V12)

The concert was in the hard rock theme. After the bottom three were announced, Nooknick (V9) was in the bottom three for the third time, but she was provided immunity by the judges this week. The audiences was shocked after the popular votes result was declared that Itch (V12) got the fewest votes though he had the top two votes during a week (the results during a week were shown until midnight of Friday before the Saturday concert). It was not the first time of AF history that the top or the top three contestants during a week would be eliminated after the concert ended, like Loogtarn (AF2), and Jack (AF4).

Week 5 - Dance
Original Airdate: August 1, 2009

 Bottom three: Ich (V1), Aof (V2), & Newty (V4)
 Immuned: Newty (V4)
 Eliminated: Ich (V1)

The AF6 concert week 5 was in a dance theme. It was the first time of Aof (V2) for bottom three. The judges decided to immuned Newty (V4) from elimination. After the popular votes result was announced, Ich (V1) was eliminated.

Week 6 - Show Power
Original Airdate: August 8, 2009

 Bottom three: Aof (V2), Zani (V6), & Nooknick (V9)
 Immuned & Safe from elimination: Nooknick (V9)

The theme of this week was show power, this was not only representing the style of music but also contestants had to do everything by themselves in a whole week. This week was special, like a mid-term examination for them, "had no class" in the AF house, "had no trainer". They all had to coach themselves, and practice for a show on their own. After the show ended, Nooknick (V9) was in the bottom three once again (her fourth time) and she also was provided immunity by the judges. Lastly, it was announced that she received the fewest votes of the night. But from the immunity she had, she was saved from this elimination and eight contestants are still in the running.

Week 7 - Mother's Choice
Original Airdate: August 15, 2009

 Top three: Tee (V5), Zani (V6), & Mac (V8)
 Best performance of Top three: Zani (V6)
 Bottom three: Aof (V2), Newty (V4), & Nooknick (V9)
 Immuned: Newty (V4)
 Eliminated: Aof (V2)

This concert is in a theme of mother's choice, contestants' mothers had come into the house to surprise them on Sunday night to give them a song they had to perform on concert. All of the songs this week was requested by all their mothers. In a concert, there was a little twist for this week. They announced list of three contestants step forward and made the audiences noticed those were bottom three; Tee (V5), Zani (V6), & Mac (V8). Then the judges decided to give the Immunity Idol to Zani (V6). After that they declared three of them were not bottom three, but top three of the week, and Zani (V6) was selected by judges to be as the best show in the top three ranks. From this, she got a special prize from a sponsor for her mother.

But it was not ended, they announced Koonjae-Sal (V3) & Ann (V10) step forward like they both are real bottom ranks, but they both were announced to be safe. This means the rest in the bottom line, Aof (V2), Newty (V4), & Nooknick (V9) are bottom three of a night. The judges had to judge again and Newty (V4) was immuned. Lastly, the popular votes was announced and Aof (V2) was eliminated.

Week 8 - The Battle
Original Airdate: August 22, 2009

 Bottom three: Newty (V4), Zani (V6), & Nooknick (V9)
 Immuned: Zani (V6)
 Eliminated: Newty (V4)

The theme for this week was the battle, as in AF5 week 11, however not as duets. All contestants had to perform together but had no chance to practice together in the AF house. After the show, judges decided to provide immunity to Zani (V6) who was in the bottom three, and the popular votes result shows that Newty (V4) got the fewest votes. This was the fourth time for her that she was in the bottom ranks, but three times previously she had received the immunity idol. This time was not as lucky for her, without the immunity idol, and also the first time she got the fewest votes. So Newty (V4) was eliminated.

Week 9 - Featuring With Our Friends
Original Airdate: August 29, 2009

 Bottom three: Koonjae-Sal (V3), Tee (V5), & Nooknick (V9)
 Immuned: Tee (V5)
 Eliminated: Nooknick (V9)

Week 10 - Thai Country
Original Airdate: September 5, 2009

 Bottom three: Koonjae-Sal (V3), Mac (V8), & Ann (V10)
 Immuned & Safe from elimination: Ann (V10)

Week 11 - The Musicals
Original Airdate: September 12, 2009

 Bottom three: Koonjae-Sal (V3), Tee (V5), & Zani (V6)
 Immuned: Zani (V6)
 Eliminated: Koonjae-Sal (V3)

Week 12 - Grand Finale
Original Airdate: September 19, 2009

 Third Runner-Up: Mac (V8)
 Second Runner-Up: Tee (V5)
 First Runner-Up: Ann (V10)
 The Winner: Zani (V6)

Contestants

In order of elimination
(ages stated are at time of competition)

In this season, there were 5 boys & 7 girls in the Top 12 finalists, which was a same as Season 1.  By the way, Zani (V6) is the first female winner of Academy Fantasia.

Summaries

Elimination chart

Professional trainers
Principal - Sattha Satthathip

Voice Trainers 
 Saovanit Nawapan (Head)
 Orawan Yenpoonsook 
 Pornpat Watanyutanont
 Suchanya Harnrojanawut
 Attapol Muncharoen

Dance Trainers
 Vanessa Guntsopon (Head)
 Torchat Pintong
 Karnpitcha Normpitakcharoen
 Akachai Torobrum

Acting Trainers
 Sarmmiti Sukbanjong (Head)
 Satathip Ponghiran
 Nucharee Srimanont
 Nontakorn Eursukcharoen

Judges
 Suthee Sangserichon (Main)
 Soros Punnkabutr
 Sobchai Kraiyulsane
 Prakasit Bosuwan

References

2009 Thai television seasons
La Academia

th:ทรู อะคาเดมี่ แฟนเทเชีย
wuu:泰国学园唱歌比赛